In March and April 2002, the three islands of the Comoros (Anjouan, Grande Comore, and Mohéli) held and approved new constitutions in referendums. The main points of the constitutions were to establish each island as an autonomous part of the Union of Comoros, along with provisions that created elected local assemblies and presidents.

Assembly of the Autonomous Island of Anjouan – 25 members
Assembly of the Autonomous Island of Mohéli – 10 members
Assembly of the Autonomous Island of Grande Comore – 20 members

See also
History of Comoros
Assembly of the Union of the Comoros

Politics of the Comoros
Political organizations based in the Comoros
Government of the Comoros